The XXX Tour was a worldwide concert tour by American rock band ZZ Top. Staged in support of their 1999 album XXX, the tour visited arenas and stadiums from 1999 to 2002. With five legs and 134 shows, the tour began in Denver, Colorado on September 12, 1999 and ended on November 1, 2002 in London, England. The first two legs took place in the United States before the next leg visited Australasia. After three legs, the band was initially expected to tour Europe, but the European leg was postponed until over two years later, which was branded as "Euro-Afrique". Although the tour provoked a range of reactions from critics, it was generally well received.

Background
ZZ Top's 1996 album Rhythmeen and the supporting Continental Safari Tour brought them to new audiences, particularly in South Africa. Unlike their previous tours, Continental Safari was a minimalistic, sparse production. According to a press release, guitarist and vocalist Billy Gibbons described the tour's production as a "no-frills, full-thrill presentation—streamlined and down and gritty", further acknowledging, "ZZ Top drives it home with a meaner rhythm than ever before." Although their 1997 Mean Rhythm Global Tour did not visit Europe, they performed over 170 shows in support of Rhythmeen.

Stage design and production
The XXX Tour stage was designed by Chris Stuba, ZZ Top's lighting  director  To design the set, Stuba collaborated with longtime production manager Donny Stuart  stage set. In place of ZZ Top's elaborate productions of the past, the XXX Tour stage was a simple setup, designed to be intimate. The set included a 48-by-30 foot (15 by 9 m) stage, and was supplemented by giant stretch fabric fixtures, known as Transformits, and were made into geometric shapes, which showed various visuals, including the "XXX" logo behind the stage; for any in-the-round venues, the Transformits were not used. Stuba faced the challenge of designing a lighting system to suit both ZZ Top and Lynyrd Skynyrd, the opening act for most of the tour; both bands used the same wash lights. The set used 87 automated luminaries and 180 PAR lamps, emitting much heat in which the band favored. Stuba explained:

Tour dates

Notes

References

ZZ Top concert tours
1999 concert tours
2000 concert tours
2002 concert tours